Çataksu is a village in the Çayırlı District, Erzincan Province, Turkey. The village had a population of 150 in 2021. The hamlets of Çatak and Yapraklı are attached to the village.

References 

Villages in Çayırlı District